Drew William Barry (born February 17, 1973) is an American retired professional basketball player. He is the son of Basketball Hall of Famer Rick Barry and has four brothers: Scooter, Jon, Canyon and Brent, who also share his profession. His grandfather Bruce Hale also played in the NBA and was Rick's college coach at Miami of Florida.  His stepmother is Lynn Barry.

Born in Oakland, California, Barry graduated from De La Salle High School in Concord in 1991 and played four seasons with the Yellow Jackets basketball team at the Georgia Institute of Technology (Georgia Tech) after redshirting his freshman year. The all-time assists leader of Georgia Tech, Barry played briefly for the Fort Wayne Fury in the CBA and in the NBA for the Atlanta Hawks, Seattle SuperSonics, and Golden State Warriors.

Prior to being signed by the Hawks on March 27, 2000, Barry played eight games with the Sydney Kings during the 1999–2000 Australian NBL season. In his eight games for the Kings, Barry averaged 7.6 points, 6.3 assists, 4.0 rebounds and 1 steal per game. His best game was on November 13, 2000 in a 99–86 loss against the Cairns Taipans where he scored 20 points, 9 assists, 8 rebounds, 1 steal and 1 block.
He also played professionally in Poland.

References

External links

Stats at basketballreference.com

1973 births
Living people
American expatriate basketball people in Australia
American expatriate basketball people in Italy
American expatriate basketball people in Poland
American men's basketball players
American people of Lithuanian descent
Asseco Gdynia players
Atlanta Hawks players
Basketball players from Oakland, California
Fort Wayne Fury players
Georgia Tech Yellow Jackets men's basketball players
Golden State Warriors players
Pallacanestro Varese players
Point guards
Seattle SuperSonics draft picks
Seattle SuperSonics players
Sydney Kings players
De La Salle High School (Concord, California) alumni